Jonathan Alberto Quintero Quintana (born 17 March 1995) is a Mexican professional footballer who plays as a forward for C.D. Zap.

External links
 
 

Living people
1995 births
Association football forwards
Leones Negros UdeG footballers
Ascenso MX players
Liga de Expansión MX players
Footballers from Colima
People from Villa de Álvarez, Colima
Mexican footballers